Double 双 is a 2005 album by mainland Chinese pop singer Zhao Wei. Its first single, "Still Time for Tomorrow" was the theme song for UNICEF's "Attention for Children Affected by AIDS" campaign. The first week sold more than 150,000 in mainland China.

Track listing

Awards and nominations
6th Top Chinese Music Chart Awards
 Nominated: Best Female Artist
 Nominated: Best Album

14th Channel [V] Globle China Music Awards
 Won: Favorite Female Artist
 Won: Favorite Music Video

13th ERC Chinese Top Ten Awards
 Won: Favorite Artist
 Won: Golden Melody of the Year-Shangguan Yan and I

Music Radio Top Chart Awards
 Won: Favorite Female Artist Mainland China
 Won: Golden Melody of the Year-Shangguan Yan and I
 Won: Best Lyrics (Wen Ya)
 Nominated: Best Female Artist Mainland China

References

2005 albums
Zhao Wei albums